Cienegas Terrace is a census-designated place (CDP) in Val Verde County, Texas, United States. The population was 3,424 at the 2010 census.

Geography
Cienegas Terrace is located at  (29.365796, -100.942693).

Demographics

2020 census

As of the 2020 United States census, there were 3,025 people, 721 households, and 634 families residing in the CDP.

2000 census
As of the census of 2000, there were 2,878 people, 699 households, and 652 families residing in the CDP. The population density was 898.3 people per square mile (347.3/km2). There were 795 housing units at an average density of 248.1/sq mi (95.9/km2). The racial makeup of the CDP was 58.48% White, 0.59% African American, 0.52% Native American, 0.28% Asian, 38.81% from other races, and 1.32% from two or more races. Hispanic or Latino of any race were 95.17% of the population.

There were 699 households, out of which 64.5% had children under the age of 18 living with them, 79.4% were married couples living together, 11.2% had a female householder with no husband present, and 6.6% were non-families. 6.0% of all households were made up of individuals, and 2.4% had someone living alone who was 65 years of age or older. The average household size was 4.12 and the average family size was 4.28.

In the CDP, the population was spread out, with 41.8% under the age of 18, 9.8% from 18 to 24, 27.5% from 25 to 44, 15.8% from 45 to 64, and 5.1% who were 65 years of age or older. The median age was 24 years. For every 100 females, there were 96.2 males. For every 100 females age 18 and over, there were 93.1 males.

The median income for a household in the CDP was $20,719, and the median income for a family was $22,328. Males had a median income of $17,434 versus $18,409 for females. The per capita income for the CDP was $6,936. About 42.8% of families and 43.8% of the population were below the poverty line, including 48.0% of those under age 18 and 60.1% of those age 65 or over.

Education
Cienegas Terrace is served by the San Felipe Del Rio Consolidated Independent School District.

The whole county is served by Southwest Texas Junior College according to the Texas Education Code.

References

Census-designated places in Texas
Census-designated places in Val Verde County, Texas